Raúl Caballero may refer to:

 Raúl Caballero (footballer, born 1978), Spanish footballer
 Raúl Caballero (footballer, born 2001), Spanish footballer